El Cantar de mio Cid, literally "The Song of my Cid", or "The Song of my lord" (or El Poema de mio Cid), also known in English as The Poem of the Cid, is the oldest preserved Castilian epic poem (Spanish: epopeya). Based on a true story, it tells of the deeds of the Castilian hero Rodrigo Díaz de Vivar known as El Cid and takes place during the eleventh century, an era of conflicts in the Iberian Peninsula between the Kingdom of Castile and various Taifa principalities of Al-Andalus. It is considered a national epic of Spain.

The work survives in a medieval manuscript which is now in the Spanish National Library.

Origin 
The Spanish medievalist Ramón Menéndez Pidal included the Cantar de mio Cid in the popular tradition he termed the mester de juglaría. Mester de juglaría refers to the medieval tradition according to which popular poems were passed down from generation to generation, being changed in the process. These poems were meant to be performed in public by minstrels (or juglares), who each performed the traditional composition differently according to the performance context—sometimes adding their own twists to the epic poems they told, or abbreviating it according to the situation.

El Cantar de mio Cid shows signs of being designed for oral transmission. For example, the poem ends with a request for wine for the person who has recited it (Es leido, dadnos del vino).
On the other hand, some critics (known as individualists) believe El Cantar de mio Cid was composed by one Per Abbad (in English, Abbot Peter) who appears to be credited as the writer of the work in a colophon to the text. It has been suggested that the poem, which is written in Old Spanish, is an example of the learned poetry that was cultivated in the monasteries and other centers of erudition. 
However, Per Abbad puts the date 1207 after his name and current thinking is that his claim to have written the work has simply been copied along with the text of an earlier manuscript now  lost. The existing copy forms part of a 14th-century codex in the Biblioteca Nacional de España (National Library) in Madrid, Spain. It is, however, incomplete, missing the first page and two others in the middle. For the purposes of preservation, it is not normally on display.

There are sources that claim that the song was written several years earlier, considering the historical Cid died in 1099. These, however, recognize that the poem itself would not have been written immediately after the death of its titular hero since the narrative would not have been picked up if the story of the Cid had not yet attained its legendary status. There are those who also take into consideration the emergence of the Carolingian legends, which began after 1100 since it is believed that these stories also influenced the poem. The Poem of the Cid, for example, echoes the plot devices used in The Song of Roland epic.

Title
One of the oldest documents preserved at the Real Academia de la Historia in Madrid presents only this phrase as the poem's title: Hic incipiunt gesta Roderici Campi Docti, which means "Here begin the deeds of Rodrigo the Campeador." Its current title is a 19th-century proposal by Ramón Menéndez Pidal since its original title is unknown. Some merely call the poem El Poema del Cid on the grounds that it is not a cantar but a poem made up of three cantares. The title has been translated into English as The Lay of the Cid and The Song of the Cid. Mio Cid is literally "My Cid", a term of endearment used by the narrator and by characters in the work. The word Cid originates from Arabic sidi or sayyid (سيد), an honorific title similar to English Sir (in the medieval, courtly sense).

The commonly used title El Cantar de mio Cid means literally The Song of my Lord or The Poem of my Lord. As the original title of the poem is lost to history, this one was suggested by historian Ramón Menéndez Pidal. It is Old Spanish (old Castilian), adjusted to modern orthography. In modern Spanish the title might be rendered El Poema de mi Señor or El Poema de mi Jefe. The expression cantar (literally "to sing") was used to mean a chant or a song. The word Cid (Çid in old Spanish orthography), was a derivation of the dialectal Arabic word سيد sîdi or sayyid, which means lord or master. During the period the poem was written, Arabic was still a widely used and highly regarded language in Iberia (hence the fact that modern Spanish still contains many Arabic words). Çid was not a common word, though, in old Spanish and thus can be treated almost as a proper noun.

The story
El Cid married the cousin of King Alfonso VI, Doña Ximena, but for certain reasons (according to the story, he made the king swear by Santa Gadea that he had not ordered the fratricide of his own brother), he fell into the disfavor of the king and had to leave his home country of Castile.  

The story begins with the exile of El Cid, whose enemies had unjustly accused him of stealing money from the king, Alfonso VI of Castile and León, leading to his exile. To regain his honor, he participated in the battles against the Moorish armies and conquered Valencia. By these heroic acts he regained the confidence of the king and his honor was restored. The king personally marries El Cid's daughters to the infantes (princes) of Carrión. However, when the princes are humiliated by El Cid's men for their cowardice, the infantes swear revenge. They beat their new wives and leave them for dead. When El Cid learns of this he pleads to the king for justice. The infantes are forced to return El Cid's dowry and are defeated in a duel, stripping them of all honor. El Cid's two daughters then remarry to the principes (crown princes) of Navarre and Aragon. Through the marriages of his daughters, El Cid began the unification of Spain.

Unlike other European medieval epics, the tone is realist.
There is no magic, even the apparition of archangel Gabriel (verses 404–410) happens in a dream.
However, it also departs from historic truth: for example, there is no mention of his son, his daughters were not named Elvira and Sol and they did not become queens.

It consists of more than 3,700 verses of usually 14 through 16 syllables, each with a caesura between the hemistiches. The rhyme is assonant.

Since 1913, and following the work of Ramón Menéndez Pidal, the entire work is conventionally divided into three parts:

Cantar del Destierro (verses 1–1086)

El Cid is exiled from Castile by King Alfonso VI and fights against the Moors to regain his honor.

Rodrigo Díaz de Vivar is called Mío Cid (meaning My Lord) by the Moors. His current task is to collect the tributes from the Moorish territory owed to his king, Alfonso VI of León. Cid's enemy accuses him of taking some of these tributes and the king exiles him from León and Castile. Before he leaves, he places his wife, Doña Ximena, and his two daughters, Doña Elvira and Doña Sol, in the Monastery of Cardeña. The canto then gives accounts of raids in the Moorish territory in which Cid and his men get rich off of the spoils.

Cantar de las bodas de las hijas del Cid (verses 1087–2277)
El Cid defends the city of Valencia, defeating King Chufa ibn Tashfin of the Almoravids. El Cid restores his honor and grants his daughters permission to marry the infantes of Carrión.

It begins with Cid's capture of the city of Valencia. He brings his family to live with him. It is discovered that the Infantes (princes) de Carrión, the nephews to the king, are the enemies who caused Cid's exile. They plot to marry his daughters to take some of his wealth. The king acts on behalf of his nephews and pardons Cid and allows the marriages. Cid suspects that something bad will happen from the marriages but he allows it anyway.

Cantar de la Afrenta de Corpes (verses 2278–3730)
The infantes of Carrión were put to shame after being scared of a lion roaming in the court and running away from a campaign to fight against the Moors. So, in revenge, they decide to abuse and abandon their wives at the roadside in Corpes, tied to trees. Once more, El Cid has to gain his honor back, so he asks the court of Toledo for justice. The infantes are defeated in a duel by El Cid's men, and his daughters remarry to the infantes of Navarre and Aragon.

The Cantar shows that the Infantes are cowards in battles with the Moors. They are made fun of and decide to get revenge by attacking their wives. They set out for Carrión with their wives and an escort, Felix Muñoz, the cousin of the daughters. Once on the journey, they send the escort ahead of them, steal their wives' great dowries (including two beautiful swords) and beat them and leave them for dead. Muñoz suspects trouble and returns to his cousins and takes them to receive help. Cid seeks to right the wrongs done to his daughters, and a trial is held. A duel is held between some of Cid's men and the Infantes in which the Infantes lose. In the middle of the trial, a message is sent from the kings of Navarra and Aragon, proposing to marry their sons to Cid's daughters. These marriages take place after the defeat of the Infantes and near the end of the story.

Authorship and composition date
The linguistic analysis allows the reconstruction of a 12th-century previous text, which Ramón Menéndez Pidal dated circa 1140. Date and authorship are still open to debate. Certain aspects of the conserved text belong to a well-informed author, with precise knowledge of the law in effect by the end of the 12th century and beginning of the 13th, who knew the area bordering with Burgos.

Extract
These are the first two known stanzas. The format has been somewhat regularized (e.g., "mio" for "myo", "rr" for "R", "ñ" for "nn", "llorando" for "lorando", "v" for "u", adding modern punctuation and capitalization):

De los sos oios tan fuertemientre llorando,
Tornava la cabeça e estavalos catando;
Vio puertas abiertas e uços sin cañados,
alcandaras vazias, sin pielles e sin mantos,
e sin falcones e sin adtores mudados.
Sospiro Mio Cid, ca mucho avie grandes cuidados.
Fablo mio Cid bien e tan mesurado:
«¡grado a ti, Señor Padre, que estas en alto!
»Esto me an buelto mios enemigos malos.»

Alli pienssan de aguiiar, alli sueltan las rriendas;
ala exida de Bivar ovieron la corneia diestra
e entrando a Burgos ovieronla siniestra.
Meçio Mio Cid los ombros e engrameo la tiesta:
«¡Albricia, Albar Fañez, ca echados somos de tierra!»
[»Mas a grand ondra tornaremos a Castiella.»]

(The last verse is not in the original transcript by Per Abbat, but it was inserted by Menéndez Pidal because it appears in later chronicles, e.g., "Veinte Reyes de Castilla (1344)".)

Sample text
The following is a sample from Cantar de Mio Cid (lines 330–365), with abbreviations resolved, punctuation (the original has none), and some modernized letters. Below, the original Old Spanish text is presented in the first column, along with the same sample in modern Spanish in the second column and an English translation in the third column.

Translations into English
 Robert Southey, Chronicle of the Cid, 1808, prose translation with other matter from chronicles and ballads, with an appendix including a partial verse translation by John Hookham Frere.
 John Ormsby, The Poem of Cid, 1879, with introduction and notes.
 Archer Milton Huntington, Poem of the Cid, (1897–1903), reprinted from the unique manuscript at Madrid, with translation and notes.
 Lesley Byrd Simpson, The Poem of the Cid, 1957.
 W. S. Merwin, The Poem of the Cid, 1959.
 Paul Blackburn, Poem of the Cid: a modern translation with notes, 1966.
 Rita Hamilton, The Poem of the Cid: Dual Language Edition, 1985.
 Burton Raffel, The Song of the Cid: A Dual-Language Edition with Parallel Text, 2009. 
 Michael Harney, The Epic of The Cid with related texts, 2011.
Matthew Bailey, selections in pedagogical edition from Open Iberia/América (open access teaching anthology), 2020.

See also
 El Cid
 Mocedades de Rodrigo
 Camino del Cid

Notes

References

External links

 Cantar de Mio Cid in English
 Audio in Old Spanish (first column)
 Scanned copies of the manuscript of the Cantar de Mio Cid—Spanish
 Musical aspects of the Lay of the Cid (Spanish, brief introduction in English).
Selections in Spanish and English (pedagogical edition) with introduction, notes, and bibliography in Open Iberia/América (open access teaching anthology)